No. 659 Squadron AAC is a squadron of the British Army's Army Air Corps (AAC) based at RNAS Yeovilton (HMS Heron) flying AgustaWestland Wildcat AH.1's as part of 1 Regiment Army Air Corps.

The squadron was reformed from No. 659 Squadron RAF on 1 November 1971 while in Germany.

See also

 List of Army Air Corps aircraft units

References

Citations

Bibliography

External links
 

Army Air Corps aircraft squadrons
Military units and formations established in 1969